Henry County Schools is a public school district in Henry County, Georgia, United States, based in McDonough. It serves the communities of Blacksville, Flippen, Hampton, Kelleytown, Locust Grove, McDonough, Ola, and Stockbridge.

Schools

High schools

Dutchtown High School
Eagle's Landing High School
Hampton High School 
Locust Grove High School
Luella High School
Ola High School
Stockbridge High School
Union Grove High School
Woodland High School
McDonough High School

Middle schools

Austin Road Middle School
Dutchtown Middle School
Eagle's Landing Middle School
Hampton Middle School 
Locust Grove Middle School
Luella Middle School
Ola Middle School
Stockbridge Middle School
Union Grove Middle School
Woodland Middle School

Elementary schools 

Austin Road Elementary School
Bethlehem Elementary School
Cotton Indian Elementary School
Dutchtown Elementary School
East Lake Elementary School
Fairview Elementary School
Flippen Elementary School
Hampton Charter Elementary School
Hickory Flat Charter Elementary School
Locust Grove Elementary School
Luella Elementary School
McDonough Elementary School (permanently closed)
Mount Carmel Elementary School
New Hope Elementary School
Oakland Elementary School
Ola Elementary School
Pate's Creek Elementary School
Pleasant Grove Elementary School
Red Oak Elementary School
Rocky Creek Elementary School
Rock Spring Elementary School
Smith-Barnes Elementary School
Stockbridge Elementary School
Timber Ridge Elementary School
Tussahaw Elementary School
Unity Grove Elementary School
Walnut Creek Elementary School
Wesley Lakes Elementary School
Woodland Elementary School

Other schools
Patrick Henry High School

References

External links

School districts in Georgia (U.S. state)
Education in Henry County, Georgia